Edmund O'Meara (also known as Edmund Meara; 1614–1681) was an Irish physiologist and one of the last prominent champions of the medical ideas of Galen. Son of Dermod O'Meara who was a physician, poet and author. O'Meara is remembered today for his criticism of vivisection, stating that the agony suffered by lab animals distorted the research results, using this as a basis to reject William Harvey's ideas about the circulatory system and defend the earlier theories of Galen.

O'Meara wrote an epitaph for Malachy Ó Caollaidhe, but was unable to locate his grave.

See also

 Barry Edward O'Meara, surgeon, 1786–1836.
 Kathleen O'Meara, catholic writer, 1839–1888.

References

 O'Meara, Edmund, p. 808, Oxford Dictionary of National Biography 41 – Norbury – Osborn, Oxford, 2004.

External links

17th-century Irish medical doctors
Irish physiologists
1614 births
1681 deaths
Irish surgeons
People from County Tipperary